Tara Elizabeth Moriarty is an Australian politician. She has been a member of the New South Wales Legislative Council since 2019, representing the Australian Labor Party.

Moriarty was Chair of Club Plus Superannuation and Secretary/President of the Liquor and Hospitality Division of UV prior to her election.

Shadow Minister for Mental Health and Crown Lands 2019-2021

Shadow Minister for Corrections, Juvenile Justice and Medical Research 2021 -

Senior Vice President NSW Labor

Member ALP National Executive

References

 

Year of birth missing (living people)
Living people
Members of the New South Wales Legislative Council
Australian Labor Party members of the Parliament of New South Wales
Labor Right politicians
21st-century Australian politicians
Women members of the New South Wales Legislative Council
21st-century Australian women politicians